Nex CCN Cycling Team is a UCI Continental cycling team established in 2012 based in Laos.

Team roster

Major wins
2012
Stage 4 Tour of Singkarak, John Ebsen
2013
Asian Cycling Time Trial Championships, Muradian Halmuratov
Asian Cycling Road Race Championships, Muradian Halmuratov
Stage 6 The Maha Chackri Sirindhon's Cup Tour of Thailand, Ki Seok Lee
Stage 1 Le Tour de Filipinas, Ki Seok Lee
Melaka Governor's Cup, Lex Nederlof
2014
Stage 4 Le Tour de Filipinas, Ariya Phounsavath
Prologue Tour of Al Zubarah, Roman Van Uden
2015
Stage 2 Tour de Borneo, Jos Koop
2017
Stage 5 Tour de Flores, Daniel Whitehouse

References

UCI Continental Teams (Asia)
Cycling teams established in 2012
Cycling teams based in Laos
Cycling teams based in Brunei